Confessions of a Go-Go Girl is a 2008 Lifetime made-for-television film starring Chelsea Hobbs, directed by Grant Harvey, based on a play by Jill Morley and written an co-executive produced by Lenore Kletter.

Plot
Jane McCoy (Hobbs), a recent college graduate, decides to scrap her plans for law school to pursue an acting career full-time, against her parents wishes. Struggling to make ends meet, she meets a confident and persuasive friend (Carter) at her part-time sales job in a clothes store, who shows her the way to make extra money Go-go dancing. What starts as just an "easy money" job, however, rapidly becomes an all-consuming activity.

Cast
Chelsea Hobbs - Jane McCoy
Sarah Carter - Angela Lucas
Corbin Bernsen - Nick Harvey
Rachel Hunter - Donna Mercer
Travis Milne - Eric Baldwin
Tygh Runyan - Kurt Powell
Karen Kruper - Grace McCoy
James D. Hopkin - Jim McCoy
Graeme Black - Jamie 'Junior' Mccoy
Judith Bucha - Anne Branson
James Kot - Roy
Stafford Lawrence - Ziggy
Khari Jones - Yuppie Manager
Shae Keebler - Elizabeth
Terry David Mulligan - Dr. Double D
Jennifer Rae Westley - Lily (as Jennifer Westley)
Scott McAdam - Groom
Rod Heatheringston - Best Man
Shannon Micol - Young Woman

References

External links

2008 television films
2008 films
2008 drama films
American drama films
2000s English-language films
Lifetime (TV network) films
American television films